Antonio "Tony" Dixon is an American songwriter, singer and record producer, also known for his work with production duo The Underdogs and Eric Dawkins under the production moniker The Pentagon.

Career
Dixon began his songwriting and production career as an associate member of production duo The Underdogs. Along with Harvey Mason Jr. and Damon Thomas and a wider collective, also consisting of Tank, Eric Dawkins and Steve Russell, he co-crafted several singles, including Omarion's "O" (2004), "Naked" (2005), and Monica's "Sideline Ho" (2007), predominantly serving as an instrumentalist and arranger on the tracks.

In the late 2000s, Dixon and Dawkins formed the production team The Pentagon. A departure from the R&B sounds of his previous works, the duo worked with a wider range of artists and sounds, particularly in the pop and gospel genres, including Kristinia DeBarge and Justin Bieber. Following their collaboration on Babyface's 2005 album Grown & Sexy along with The Underdogs, Babyface asked Dixon to work with him on Beyoncé's 2011 album 4 on which they co-produced the single "Best Thing I Never Had".

In 2018, Dixon produced on Toni Braxton's ninth studio album Sex & Cigarettes (2018). Its leading single "Long as I Live," produced by Dixon, became her eight on the Billboard Adult R&B Songs and earned  two nominations for Best R&B Performance and Best R&B Song at the 61st Annual Grammy Awards.

Selected production credits

References

Living people
African-American record producers
African-American male singer-songwriters
Year of birth missing (living people)
21st-century African-American male singers